The Arkhangelsk constituency (No. 72) is a Russian legislative constituency in Arkhangelsk Oblast. In 1993-2007 the constituency covered the entirety of Arkhangelsk as well as Severodvinsk and northern Arkhangelsk Oblast. During redistricting in 2016, the constituency lost parts of Arkhangelsk, as well as several districts to the east, to Kotlas constituency but gained the entirety of western Arkhangelsk Oblast.

Members elected

Election results

1993

|-
! colspan=2 style="background-color:#E9E9E9;text-align:left;vertical-align:top;" |Candidate
! style="background-color:#E9E9E9;text-align:left;vertical-align:top;" |Party
! style="background-color:#E9E9E9;text-align:right;" |Votes
! style="background-color:#E9E9E9;text-align:right;" |%
|-
|style="background-color:#EA3C38"|
|align=left|Sergey Shulgin
|align=left|Civic Union
|
|47.75%
|-
| colspan="5" style="background-color:#E9E9E9;"|
|- style="font-weight:bold"
| colspan="3" style="text-align:left;" | Total
| 
| 100%
|-
| colspan="5" style="background-color:#E9E9E9;"|
|- style="font-weight:bold"
| colspan="4" |Source:
|
|}

1995

|-
! colspan=2 style="background-color:#E9E9E9;text-align:left;vertical-align:top;" |Candidate
! style="background-color:#E9E9E9;text-align:left;vertical-align:top;" |Party
! style="background-color:#E9E9E9;text-align:right;" |Votes
! style="background-color:#E9E9E9;text-align:right;" |%
|-
|style="background-color:"|
|align=left|Vasily Grishin
|align=left|Independent
|
|27.53%
|-
|style="background-color:"|
|align=left|Pavel Pozdeyev
|align=left|Independent
|
|18.73%
|-
|style="background-color:"|
|align=left|Galina Anisimova
|align=left|Independent
|
|6.76%
|-
|style="background-color:"|
|align=left|Yury Grishin
|align=left|Independent
|
|7.28%
|-
|style="background-color:#3A46CE"|
|align=left|Mikhail Danilov
|align=left|Democratic Choice of Russia – United Democrats
|
|6.15%
|-
|style="background-color:#1A1A1A"|
|align=left|Yury Shcherbachev
|align=left|Stanislav Govorukhin Bloc
|
|3.98%
|-
|style="background-color:#DD137B"|
|align=left|Nikolay Zalyvsky
|align=left|Social Democrats
|
|3.87%
|-
|style="background-color:"|
|align=left|Sergey Kurochkin
|align=left|Liberal Democratic Party
|
|3.59%
|-
|style="background-color:"|
|align=left|Anatoly Koltunov
|align=left|Power to the People
|
|2.72%
|-
|style="background-color:"|
|align=left|Igor Zaborsky
|align=left|Independent
|
|2.24%
|-
|style="background-color:"|
|align=left|Vladimir Lushin
|align=left|Independent
|
|0.87%
|-
|style="background-color:#000000"|
|colspan=2 |against all
|
|13.24%
|-
| colspan="5" style="background-color:#E9E9E9;"|
|- style="font-weight:bold"
| colspan="3" style="text-align:left;" | Total
| 
| 100%
|-
| colspan="5" style="background-color:#E9E9E9;"|
|- style="font-weight:bold"
| colspan="4" |Source:
|
|}

1999

|-
! colspan=2 style="background-color:#E9E9E9;text-align:left;vertical-align:top;" |Candidate
! style="background-color:#E9E9E9;text-align:left;vertical-align:top;" |Party
! style="background-color:#E9E9E9;text-align:right;" |Votes
! style="background-color:#E9E9E9;text-align:right;" |%
|-
|style="background-color:#3B9EDF"|
|align=left|Aleksandr Piskunov
|align=left|Fatherland – All Russia
|
|23.30%
|-
|style="background-color:"|
|align=left|Vasily Grishin (incumbent)
|align=left|Independent
|
|15.74%
|-
|style="background-color:"|
|align=left|Tatyana Podyakova
|align=left|Independent
|
|11.97%
|-
|style="background-color:"|
|align=left|Pyotr Skidan
|align=left|Independent
|
|8.95%
|-
|style="background-color:"|
|align=left|Mikhail Silantyev
|align=left|Liberal Democratic Party
|
|5.42%
|-
|style="background-color:#020266"|
|align=left|Viktor Shiryayev
|align=left|Russian Socialist Party
|
|4.79%
|-
|style="background-color:"|
|align=left|Igor Zaborsky
|align=left|Kedr
|
|3.82%
|-
|style="background-color:"|
|align=left|Viktor Shershnev
|align=left|Independent
|
|2.75%
|-
|style="background-color:"|
|align=left|Ivan Bentsa
|align=left|Independent
|
|2.64%
|-
|style="background-color:"|
|align=left|Aleksandr Krasnoshtan
|align=left|Independent
|
|2.20%
|-
|style="background-color:"|
|align=left|Sergey Perervus
|align=left|Independent
|
|1.47%
|-
|style="background-color:#084284"|
|align=left|Vladislav Goldin
|align=left|Spiritual Heritage
|
|1.35%
|-
|style="background-color:"|
|align=left|Sergey Startsev
|align=left|Independent
|
|1.18%
|-
|style="background-color:#000000"|
|colspan=2 |against all
|
|13.04%
|-
| colspan="5" style="background-color:#E9E9E9;"|
|- style="font-weight:bold"
| colspan="3" style="text-align:left;" | Total
| 
| 100%
|-
| colspan="5" style="background-color:#E9E9E9;"|
|- style="font-weight:bold"
| colspan="4" |Source:
|
|}

2001
The results of the by-election were annulled due to low turnout (22.13%).

|-
! colspan=2 style="background-color:#E9E9E9;text-align:left;vertical-align:top;" |Candidate
! style="background-color:#E9E9E9;text-align:left;vertical-align:top;" |Party
! style="background-color:#E9E9E9;text-align:right;" |Votes
! style="background-color:#E9E9E9;text-align:right;" |%
|-
|style="background-color:"|
|align=left|Tamara Rumyantseva
|align=left|Independent
|
|50.86%
|-
|style="background-color:"|
|align=left|Nikolay Malakov
|align=left|Independent
|
|11.69%
|-
|style="background-color:"|
|align=left|Aleksandr Novikov
|align=left|Independent
|
|9.01%
|-
|style="background-color:"|
|align=left|Aleksandr Chaplinsky
|align=left|Independent
|
|5.17%
|-
|style="background-color:"|
|align=left|Yelena Pozhidayeva
|align=left|Independent
|
|3.62%
|-
|style="background-color:"|
|align=left|Mikhail Silantyev
|align=left|Independent
|
|2.77%
|-
|style="background-color:"|
|align=left|Valentin Gintov
|align=left|Independent
|
|2.35%
|-
|style="background-color:"|
|align=left|Pavel Nozhnin
|align=left|Independent
|
|0.88%
|-
|style="background-color:#000000"|
|colspan=2 |against all
|
|11.96%
|-
| colspan="5" style="background-color:#E9E9E9;"|
|- style="font-weight:bold"
| colspan="3" style="text-align:left;" | Total
| 
| 100%
|-
| colspan="5" style="background-color:#E9E9E9;"|
|- style="font-weight:bold"
| colspan="4" |Source:
|
|}

2003

|-
! colspan=2 style="background-color:#E9E9E9;text-align:left;vertical-align:top;" |Candidate
! style="background-color:#E9E9E9;text-align:left;vertical-align:top;" |Party
! style="background-color:#E9E9E9;text-align:right;" |Votes
! style="background-color:#E9E9E9;text-align:right;" |%
|-
|style="background-color:"|
|align=left|Vladimir Krupchak
|align=left|Independent
|
|37.27%
|-
|style="background-color:"|
|align=left|Tamara Rumyantseva
|align=left|United Russia
|
|20.41%
|-
|style="background-color:"|
|align=left|Yury Guskov
|align=left|Communist Party
|
|7.05%
|-
|style="background-color:"|
|align=left|Mikhail Silantyev
|align=left|Liberal Democratic Party
|
|4.55%
|-
|style="background-color:"|
|align=left|Mikhail Sokolov
|align=left|Yabloko
|
|3.27%
|-
|style="background-color:"|
|align=left|Galina Zhuravleva
|align=left|Independent
|
|3.02%
|-
|style="background-color:"|
|align=left|Natalya Korzhinevskaya
|align=left|Agrarian Party
|
|1.67%
|-
|style="background-color:"|
|align=left|Andrey Georgiyev
|align=left|Independent
|
|1.29%
|-
|style="background-color:"|
|align=left|Alfiya Grishko
|align=left|Independent
|
|0.89%
|-
|style="background-color:#7B746F"|
|align=left|Pavel Nozhnin
|align=left|People's Republican Party of Russia
|
|0.78%
|-
|style="background-color:#00A1FF"|
|align=left|Yevgeny Kislov
|align=left|Party of Russia's Rebirth-Russian Party of Life
|
|0.61%
|-
|style="background-color:#7C73CC"|
|align=left|Aleksandr Selyagin
|align=left|Great Russia – Eurasian Union
|
|0.43%
|-
|style="background-color:#000000"|
|colspan=2 |against all
|
|17.59%
|-
| colspan="5" style="background-color:#E9E9E9;"|
|- style="font-weight:bold"
| colspan="3" style="text-align:left;" | Total
| 
| 100%
|-
| colspan="5" style="background-color:#E9E9E9;"|
|- style="font-weight:bold"
| colspan="4" |Source:
|
|}

2016

|-
! colspan=2 style="background-color:#E9E9E9;text-align:left;vertical-align:top;" |Candidate
! style="background-color:#E9E9E9;text-align:left;vertical-align:top;" |Party
! style="background-color:#E9E9E9;text-align:right;" |Votes
! style="background-color:#E9E9E9;text-align:right;" |%
|-
|style="background-color: " |
|align=left|Dmitry Yurkov
|align=left|United Russia
|
|34.43%
|-
|style="background-color:"|
|align=left|Olga Yepifanova
|align=left|A Just Russia
|
|24.24%
|-
|style="background-color:"|
|align=left|Aleksandr Novikov
|align=left|Communist Party
|
|14.13%
|-
|style="background-color:"|
|align=left|Sergey Pivkov
|align=left|Liberal Democratic Party
|
|12.96%
|-
|style="background-color: "|
|align=left|Mikhail Butorin
|align=left|People's Freedom Party
|
|2.91%
|-
|style="background-color: "|
|align=left|Mikhail Silantyev
|align=left|Rodina
|
|2.84%
|-
|style="background-color: " |
|align=left|Andrey Churakov
|align=left|Yabloko
|
|2.38%
|-
|style="background:"| 
|align=left|Yury Rusakov
|align=left|Communists of Russia
|
|1.59%
|-
|style="background-color:"|
|align=left|Vyacheslav Yerykanov
|align=left|Patriots of Russia
|
|1.23%
|-
| colspan="5" style="background-color:#E9E9E9;"|
|- style="font-weight:bold"
| colspan="3" style="text-align:left;" | Total
| 
| 100%
|-
| colspan="5" style="background-color:#E9E9E9;"|
|- style="font-weight:bold"
| colspan="4" |Source:
|
|}

2021

|-
! colspan=2 style="background-color:#E9E9E9;text-align:left;vertical-align:top;" |Candidate
! style="background-color:#E9E9E9;text-align:left;vertical-align:top;" |Party
! style="background-color:#E9E9E9;text-align:right;" |Votes
! style="background-color:#E9E9E9;text-align:right;" |%
|-
|style="background-color: " |
|align=left|Aleksandr Spiridonov
|align=left|United Russia
|
|28.93%
|-
|style="background-color: " |
|align=left|Oleg Mandrykin
|align=left|Yabloko
|
|17.56%
|-
|style="background-color:"|
|align=left|Nadezhda Vinogradova
|align=left|Communist Party
|
|16.01%
|-
|style="background-color:"|
|align=left|Vladimir Sukharev
|align=left|Liberal Democratic Party
|
|9.14%
|-
|style="background-color: " |
|align=left|Igor Gubinskikh
|align=left|New People
|
|7.16%
|-
|style="background-color:"|
|align=left|Oleg Chernenko
|align=left|A Just Russia — For Truth
|
|6.75%
|-
|style="background-color: "|
|align=left|Sergey Filonov
|align=left|Party of Pensioners
|
|3.68%
|-
|style="background-color: "|
|align=left|Yaroslav Savichev
|align=left|Rodina
|
|2.35%
|-
|style="background:"| 
|align=left|Dmitry Kargapoltsev
|align=left|Communists of Russia
|
|2.27%
|-
|style="background:"| 
|align=left|Vladimir Kogut
|align=left|Russian Party of Freedom and Justice
|
|1.89%
|-
| colspan="5" style="background-color:#E9E9E9;"|
|- style="font-weight:bold"
| colspan="3" style="text-align:left;" | Total
| 
| 100%
|-
| colspan="5" style="background-color:#E9E9E9;"|
|- style="font-weight:bold"
| colspan="4" |Source:
|
|}

Notes

References

Russian legislative constituencies
Politics of Arkhangelsk Oblast